Superboy's Legion is a two-issue comic book mini-series, published by DC Comics cover dated February and March 2001, under the Elseworlds imprint. Written by Mark Farmer, with art by Farmer and Alan Davis. The comic series is a tale about the baby Kal-El, the last survivor of the doomed planet Krypton, arrives on Earth in the 30th century and is found by billionaire R.J. Brande. As Kal grows up, he decides to find other super-powered teens like himself and form a Legion of Super-Heroes. The story uses elements from the Silver Age Comics, most notably from the original Legion of Super-Heroes series.

Plot
In the year 2987, R.J. Brande, the galaxy's richest man and head of Brande Industries, discovers a life-pod in the asteroid belt. Inside the life-pod lies a baby boy, Kal-El of Krypton. Kal-El's rocket was set on a course for the planet Earth, in the 20th century moments before Krypton was destroyed. But the rocket crashed into an asteroid and remained there for approximately one thousand years. In 3001, Kal-El became  Brande's adopted son, Kal Brande. Kal gains superpowers due to the effects of the radiation from Earth's sun and calls himself Superboy. Inspired by legends of superheroes from the 20th century, he uses his powers to help humans.

Every planet in the Milky Way Galaxy is protected by the Science Police, who are guided by the supercomputer Universo. The Science Police sees Kal as a misfit, because he damages public property and makes unregistered flights. The Science Police threatens R.J's business, if he doesn't control Kal's behavior. After a heated argument between Superboy and R.J, Superboy flies off into space to the former location of Krypton. He witnesses, Talu-Katua, a member of the Green Lantern Corps fighting against a Khund space vessel and helps. Talu-Katu reveals that the Green Lantern Corps protects all sectors of space, that are not under police protection, but their resources are limited, and this gives Superboy the idea to form his own group.

Meanwhile, on the luxury space cruiser Lystrata, a young couple, Imra Ardeen, a psychic, and Rokk Krinn, who has magnetic abilities, help defend the ship against an energy being, a blister beast, and are helped by Superboy. The trio form a team called Superboy's Legion. Imra calls herself Saturn Girl, and Rokk calls himself Cosmic Boy. They hold televised tryouts, covered by young reporter Lois Olsen, for more members on Titan. They induct best friends Dirk Morgna (Sun Boy) and Gim Allon (Colossal Boy), Salu Digby (Shrinking Violet), Chuck Taine (Bouncing Boy), Jan Arrah (Element Lad), and Tasmia Mallor (Shadow Lass). Superboy meets Lois and a spark seems to form between the two after the tryouts. When news comes of a giant asteroid about to collide with planet Rimbor, the Legion sets out to save the planet.

On Rimbor, word of the asteroid's collision has caused mass hysteria. As the Legion heads for Rimbor, they are contacted by Lyle Norg (Invisible Kid) and Querl Dox (Brainiac 5), informing the Legion that Superboy's plan to smash the asteroid will fail because the asteroid is too large. The Legion calls in Thom Kallor (Star Boy), the last survivor of the planet Xanthu, who uses his gravity powers to increase Superboy's mass to stop the asteroid. Superboy shatters the asteroid, and the Legion collects the fragments.

The Legion is attacked by the Fatal Five, five of the most dangerous criminals in the galaxy; and the ones responsible for Xanthu's destruction. Due to his weakness against magic, Emerald Empress gains an advantage over Superboy with her powerful talisman, the Emerald Eye of Ekron. Mano, a mutant born with an anti-matter touch, burns Star Boy's face. Cosmic Boy has his right arm cut off by the Persuader's atomic axe, and Colossal Boy is killed in battle with the giant Validus. When the Five leave, they take Brainiac 5 back to their base, under orders from their leader, Lex Luthor.

Superboy is not sure he wants to do any more good, after getting Colossal Boy killed. But Star Boy encourages Superboy to rescue Brainiac 5, not to prove himself or avenge anyone, but because it is the right thing to do. The rescue party arrive at Colu, but the planet is now visible and is being accessed by the computers in Luthor's ship. Luthor sics the Fatal Five on the heroes to avoid interference. Superboy and the Legion arrive and incapacitate the majority of the villains. Sensor mind controls the Emerald Empress into believing her Eye has been destroyed. Tinya and Reep trick and knock out Mano and the Persuader, and Sun Boy uses his rage at Colossal Boy's death to stop Validus.

On Earth, Saturn Girl senses a malevolent presence inside the Universo computer and attempts to find it, but Commissioner Leeto orders the Science Police to gun her down. The Science Police realize Leeto is paranoid, and sees Saturn Girl is their only hope as Universo starts to crash. Saturn Girl discovers the evil presence is diverting Universo's power to Colu. Luthor becomes aware of the interference and snaps the Emerald Empress out of Sensor's illusion to stop Saturn Girl. The Empress blows up Invisible Kid's ship before she leaves, as Bouncing Boy prevents his friends crashing into Colu. The Emerald Empress arrives on Earth and traps Saturn Girl and the others, ruining any chance they had of fixing Universo. When Ferro Lad learns the Eye's powers are magical, he uses his power to turn into iron to incapacitate it, while Karate Kid uses his knowledge of pressure points to knock out the Empress. Saturn Girl then befriends the Eye and convinces it to serve as Universo's replacement.

On Colu, Superboy rescues Brainiac 5 from Luthor's ship, but Luthor has transferred his mind into an indestructible robot and continues to hack into Colu. After being rescued from Tharok by the Legion, Superboy engages Luthor, who reveals he has been watching Superboy and planned to transfer his mind into Superboy's body to achieve immortality. The Legion severs his link to Colu, and Brainiac 5 forces Luthor to face the truth—that Luthor has been dead for centuries (his body hidden in the depths of the Universo computer) and he is a holographic representation of a computer program that believes itself to be Luthor. Furious at this revelation (because it meant that his efforts to achieve immortality had all been for nothing), Luthor decides to blow his robot body up and destroy Colu. Superboy and Ultra Boy are able to remove Luthor from the planet before he explodes and save Colu. The Coluans teleport the Legion's friends and R.J. Brande to Colu and Superboy makes up with his adoptive father.

The Legion become the official heroes of the newly formed United Planets. Superboy handing over leadership of the Legion to Ultra Boy, renames himself Kal-El and starts dating Lois Olsen.

See also
List of Elseworlds publications

References

External links
Superboy's Legion at Comicvine
Superboy's Legion at DC Wikia

2001 comics debuts
Legion of Super-Heroes titles
Superman titles
Fiction set in the 30th century